Asgill  is a surname. Notable people with the surname include:

Sir Charles Asgill, 1st Baronet  (1713–1788), English banker and Lord Mayor of London
General Sir Charles Asgill, 2nd Baronet (1762–1823), British Army general
John Asgill (1659–1738), English writer and politician